Jimmy Goodrich became the World Lightweight Champion when he defeated Chilean boxer Stanislaus Loayza in a second round TKO at Queensboro Stadium in Queens, New York on July 13, 1925.  He retained the title only five months, losing it by unanimous decision to Rocky Kansas on December 7, 1925. Goodrich was known for having never been the victim of a knockout.

Early life
Goodrich was born on July 30, 1900, in Scranton, Pennsylvania, the son of Irish Catholic parents.  His father was a coal miner. Like many boxers of his era, in his youth he sold newspapers to make extra money. In his teens his family moved to Buffalo, and both he and his father became steel workers. He once wrote that some of his earliest bouts were exhibitions he gave at the factories where he worked.

When his father died, and his mother remarried, he took used his stepfather's surname Goodrich as his ringname and subsequently kept it throughout his life.  He married his wife Patti around 1920 and remained married until he died.

Early boxing career
Goodrich began a professional career in boxing by 1918, winning a string of his early fights, mostly short bouts in the Buffalo area.  One of his few early losses was to Johnny McCoy, on May 6, 1919.  McCoy would become World Flyweight Champion in October 1927. Some of the better boxers Goodrich met in his early career included Benny Valgar, Johnny Dundee, Frankie Callahan, and Louis "Kid" Kaplan.  Of these, he beat only Frankie Callahan on April 2, 1923 in Buffalo.  Significantly, in his first match with Johnny Dundee on April 4, 1922, in the Civic Arena in Toronto, he lost in a ten round split decision.  The fight was intended to have been a Jr. Lightweight World Championship except that Goodrich was one pound overweight, disqualifying him from Jr. Lightweight status.  The fight was close, and could be considered Goodrich's first bout as a contender.

Mid boxing career and rise to lightweight championship
Goodrich defeated accomplished boxer Pal Moran on September 4, 1923 in Queensboro Stadium in a ten round points decision.  He drew with Benny Valgar on April 9, 1923 in a close 12 round decision in Buffalo. He lost to Sid Terris, a highly rated lightweight in a ten round points decision in New York on January 13, 1925. 
 

Goodrich fought well known boxer Eddie "Kid" Wagner in front of a crowd of 5000 in Madison Square Garden in his first elimination match for Benny Leonard's Vacant World Lightweight Title. In a very close bout, the referees added two extra rounds to the original ten to help reach a decision. According to the Montreal Gazette, "the decision was unpopular, the crowd voicing its disapproval in a wild demonstration which continued for fifteen minutes after the end of the match". In May and June 1925, he beat Sammy Mandell and Benny Valgar, in Queensboro Stadium in Queens, both elimination bouts for the Vacant World Lightweight Title.

On July 13, 1925, in his final bout of the vacant Lightweight World Title tournament, he defeated Stanislaus Loayza at Queensboro Stadium in Queens in a second round technical knockout. In a strong showing by Goodrich, Loayza was down five times in the aggressively fought first round. Critical in the bout was the strength of Goodrich over the Chilean boxer, who claimed to have broken his ankle in his second knockdown.  Loayza tried to continue gamely fighting through the first round, limping badly, but had to concede at the opening of the second.

Gradual boxing decline
After winning the title, Goodrich's boxing record began a gentle decline in 1926, perhaps due to the superior quality of the boxers he faced.  These included tough bouts with ranked boxers Solly Seeman, and Tod Morgan, and two bouts with Mushy Callahan. Morgan was Jr. Lightweight Champion at the time of his bout with Goodrich, having taken it in December 1925, and Callahan would later hold the Jr. Lightweight Championship. Goodrich lost each of his bouts with these lightweight champions.

In his remaining four years as a boxer, he continued to face stiff competition.  He had a bout with Baby Joe Gans, two bouts with Jr. Lightweight ex-champion Jack Bernstein, and bouts with both Ruby Goldstein, and Eddie "Kid" Wagner.

Goodrich had a critically important bout with Sammy Mandell on September 25, 1928.  At the time, Mandell still held the Lightweight Championship of the World. Goodrich won the bout with Mandell in a second round TKO, breaking Mandell's collarbone.  After winning the bout decisively, Goodrich later regretted the decision he had made to fight Mandell over the required Lightweight limit, as he would have retaken the lightweight title if the fight had been a sanctioned lightweight championship.

By 1930, Goodrich lost most of his more well publicized bouts.

Retirement and life after boxing
Goodrich retired from boxing in the 1930s.  In his retirement, he operated a number of restaurants and taverns in the Buffalo area, eventually making enough to retire to Ft. Myers, Florida.

He died in Fort Myers on September 25, 1982.

Professional boxing record
All information in this section is derived from BoxRec, unless otherwise stated.

Official record

All newspaper decisions are officially regarded as “no decision” bouts and are not counted in the win/loss/draw column.

Unofficial record

Record with the inclusion of newspaper decisions in the win/loss/draw column.

See also
Lineal championship

References

External links
 

|-

  

Lightweight boxers
American male boxers
Sportspeople from Scranton, Pennsylvania
1900 births
1982 deaths
World boxing champions
World lightweight boxing champions